Immaculate Misconception is a word play on Immaculate Conception. It may refer to:

"Immaculate Misconception", a song by Motionless in White
"Immaculate Misconception", a song by Emmure
"Immaculate Misconception", a song by Cathedral
"Immaculate Misconception", an episode of the police drama program, Blue Heelers
"The Immaculate Misconception", a song by Antimatter
The Immaculate Misconception, a film starring Joseph Perrino
An Immaculate Misconception: Sex in an Age of Mechanical Reproduction, a drama by Carl Djerassi